Cleptocosmia is a monotypic moth genus in the family Geometridae. Its only species, Cleptocosmia mutabilis, is found in Australia. Both the genus and species were first described by Warren in 1896.

References

External links
 
 

Larentiinae